The Western Washington Vikings represent Western Washington University in intercollegiate sports in the Great Northwest Athletic Conference of the NCAA Division II with the exception of the women's rowing team which is a member of the Northwest Collegiate Rowing Conference. WWU has been an official member of NCAA Division II since September 1998. 

Western Washington sponsors six sports for men and nine sports for women with approximately 350 student athletes.

Student athletes
The 2010 NCAA graduation rate study showed that 69 percent of Western student-athletes receive their degrees in six years or less based on the Federal Graduation Rate formula, a rate the same as that of the full student body. This is 13 percentage points higher than the average for NCAA Division II schools nationally and 15 points higher than the average for the nine U.S. schools in the Great Northwest Athletic Conference. Using the NCAA Academic Success Rate, which includes all freshman student-athletes from the fall of 2003 and also accounts for student-athletes who transfer into or out of the institution, Western posted an 85 percent success rate, compared to the NCAA II national number of 73 percent. The average ASR of the nine U.S. GNAC schools was 77 percent.

Sports

Varsity Teams

Men's
 Basketball
 Cross-Country
 Golf
 Soccer
 Track & Field

Women's
 Basketball
 Cross-Country
 Golf
 Rowing
 Soccer
 Softball
 Track & Field
 Volleyball

Former Athletic Teams: Football, Men's Rowing, Baseball, Field Hockey, Men's Swimming, Men's Tennis, Women's Tennis, and Wrestling

National championships
Western Washington University is credited with 11 official team National Championship. 1 at the NAIA level and 10 NCAA Championships.

Additionally, Western's club sports have won the following championships:

Individual teams

Basketball
WWU won the 2011–12 NCAA Division II men's basketball national championship, just the second collegiate crown in that sport in state of Washington history and the first since 1976. WWU reached the national semifinals in men's basketball in 2001 and women's basketball in 2000. WWU ranks among the top 15 in women's basketball victories among all four-year schools with that program making 12 NCAA tournament appearances in 13 years.

Football

Others
In 2010–11, WWU placed seventh among 310 NCAA Division II schools in the Sports Director's Cup national all-sports standings, the second-highest finish in school history. The Vikings were sixth in 2009–10 and 10th in 2008–09. WWU has had eight straight Top 50 finishes and been among the Top 100 in each of its first 13 seasons as an NCAA II member. In 2010–11, Western won its third straight and seventh overall Great Northwest Athletic Conference All-Sports championship, taking league titles in volleyball, men's golf and women's golf, and the regular-season crown in women's basketball. The Vikings, who won the Northwest Collegiate Rowing Conference championship, placed second in men's and women's cross country, men's and women's outdoor track, men's indoor track and softball.

Other accomplishments include:
 Seven straight Division II national titles in women's rowing from 2005 to 2011, the first NCAA school in any division to achieve that distinction.
 Second nationally in volleyball in 2007, and the fourth-longest league winning streak in NCAA II of 57 from 2002–04.
 NAIA national softball title in 1998. 
 38-game victory string in women's soccer from 1982–84.

Sport clubs teams 

Baseball
Men's Crew
Climbing
Cycling
Equestrian
Fencing
Figure Skating
Ice Hockey
Judo
Men's Lacrosse
Women's Lacrosse
Men's Rugby
Women's Rugby
Sailing
Swimming
Tennis
Men's Ultimate
Women's Ultimate
Men's Volleyball
Women's Volleyball
Men's Water Polo
Women's Water Polo
Water Skiing
Wakeboarding
Wrestling

References

External links
 

 
Viking Age in popular culture